Diane Parry was the reigning champion, but chose not to participate.

Diana Shnaider won her first WTA 125K title, defeating Léolia Jeanjean in the final, 6–4, 6–4.

Seeds

Draw

Finals

Top half

Bottom half

Qualifying

Seeds

Qualifiers

Lucky loser

Draw

First qualifier

Second qualifier

Third qualifier

Fourth qualifier

References

External Links
Main Draw
Qualifying Draw

Montevideo Open - Singles